Enils Nadarević (born 19 July 1987) is a Bosnian-Herzegovinian footballer  winger. He currently plays for Città di Fasano.

Career
Born in Bihać in the former Yugoslavia, Nadarević moved to Italy as a youth in 2005. He signed a contract to play professional football with A.S. Varese 1910, but was initially unable to play for the club due to restrictions on non-EU players in the Serie B. He spent the 2009–10 season on loan at Serie D side A.S.D. Sanvitese.

Shortly after an Italian court ruled that he could play in Serie B, Nadarević made his league debut in a match against Siena on 18 December 2010.

Genoa
In January 2013 Genoa acquired Nadarević for €300,000 transfer fee. On 16 July he was signed by Serie B club A.C. Cesena in a temporary deal. In January 2014 he left for Bari, which he was sent off during a match and suspended for 3 matches.

Trapani
On 19 July 2014 Nadarević was signed by Serie B club Trapani in a temporary deal, with an option to purchase outright. On 21 June 2015 Trapani excised the option.

On 28 January 2016 he was signed by Novara in a temporary deal, with an option to purchase outright.

Monopoli
On 18 December 2016 was signed at Monopoli in Lega Pro.

Fidelis Andria
On August 20167 it was announced Nadarević signed a 1-year deal with the Serie C side Fidelis Andria.

References

External links
Profile at Lega Calcio

1987 births
Living people
People from Bihać
Association football wingers
Bosnia and Herzegovina footballers
S.S.D. Varese Calcio players
Genoa C.F.C. players
A.C. Cesena players
S.S.C. Bari players
Trapani Calcio players
Novara F.C. players
S.S. Monopoli 1966 players
S.S. Fidelis Andria 1928 players
U.S.D. Città di Fasano players
Serie A players
Serie B players
Serie C players
Serie D players
Bosnia and Herzegovina expatriate footballers
Expatriate footballers in Italy
Bosnia and Herzegovina expatriate sportspeople in Italy